The Big Chapel is a novel written by Thomas Kilroy that was shortlisted for the 1971 Booker Prize and recipient of the Guardian Fiction Prize (also 1971) as well as the Heinemann Prize.

Plot
The Big Chapel – part of the Liberties Revival series – centers around an infamous clerical scandal in Victorian Ireland. Within this story comes the ideas of humanity and ideology, taking a detailed look at the community and depicting life in Ireland with a focus on history and folklore in the region. It’s a book that looks at how state education is received in nineteenth century Ireland.

At times the book is humorous; other times tragic.  The main character Father Lannigan struggles with his revolution while Master Scully is stuck with too many choices. And then there is Horace Percy Butler and the landlord and amateur scientist who presents a whole tragic comic character.

The major themes in The Big Chapel center around: humanity, ideology, power and religion, depicted through tragic comedy. It is about community, and dealing with choice.  It is littered with one man being forced to make a choice set in historic Ireland.

Awards
The Big Chapel was nominated for the Booker Prize in 1971, and won the Guardian Fiction Prize and the Heinemann Prize.

Acclaim
In February 2008 Kilroy was presented with the PEN Ireland Cross Award for his contribution to literature.

According to Brian Friel, in The Guardian, “…what will keep it permanently vital will be the response it evokes once more from its astonished and grateful readers.” Tony Messenger describes the book as “a complex but rewarding work.”  He adds that it is an: “extremely well researched novel about dogma, rigidly sticking to one’s views, character definition and the little complexities in life.”

References

1971 novels
20th-century Irish novels
Novels set in Ireland
Historical novels